Kevin Hogan  (6 October 1934 – 5 November 2019) was an Australian rules footballer who played with South Melbourne in the Victorian Football League (VFL).

Hogan initially played with Benalla "Colts" / Thirds in 1949 in the Benalla & District Football League, then played with Violet Town, making his senior football debut in 1950 as a 15 year old in the Benalla Tungamah Football League. He continued to play with Violet Town until 1953, including their 1952 Benalla Tungamah Football League grand final loss to Benalla, prior to playing with South Melbourne.

Hogan was hailed as one of the VFL recruits of the year in 1954!

He later played, coached and was on the committee of the Sale Football Club. He also was a journalist for the Gippsland Times and worked for ABC Local Radio in Gippsland for over 50 years.

In the 1983 Queen's Birthday Honours Hogan was awarded the Medal of the Order of Australia for " service to the sports of cricket and football ".

Brother of former South Melbourne footballers, Pat Hogan and Frank Hogan.

Notes

External links 		

		

		
1934 births		
2019 deaths		
Australian rules footballers from Victoria (Australia)		
Sydney Swans players
Australian rules football commentators
Australian sports journalists
Recipients of the Medal of the Order of Australia